The Ministry of Consumer Affairs is the department of the Government of Spain responsible for policies regarding the protection and defense of consumer rights, as well as the regulation, authorization, supervision, control and, where appropriate, sanction of state-level gambling and gaming activities.

The department was created by Prime Minister Pedro Sánchez as part of the Sánchez II Government and it is the first time that a ministry is created to be focused on consumer affairs. It took on the responsibilities of the Ministry of Health, Consumer Affairs and Social Welfare regarding consumer affairs; as well as the responsibilities of the Ministry of Finance in gambling matters. It is overseen by the Minister for Consumer Affairs, currently Alberto Garzón, who was appointed on 13 January 2020.

Structure 
The Ministry is structured as follows:

 The General Secretariat for Consumer Affairs and Gambling.
 The Directorate-General for Consumer Affairs.
 The Deputy Directorate-General for Coordination, Quality and Consumer Cooperation.
 The Deputy Directorate-General for Arbitration and Consumer Rights.
 The Directorate-General for the Regulation of Gambling.
 The Deputy Directorate-General for the Regulation of Gambling.
 The Deputy Directorate-General for Gambling Inspection.
 The Undersecretariat of Consumer Affairs.
 The Technical General Secretariat.

Agencies and other bodies 

 The Spanish Agency for Food Safety and Nutrition.
 The Research and Quality Control Center.
 The Advisory Council for Responsible Gaming
 The National Commission to fight the manipulation of sports competitions and betting fraud.

List of officeholders
Office name:
Ministry of Consumer Affairs (2020–present)

References

Ministries established in 2020
2020 establishments in Spain
Consumer
Consumer ministries